Wilhelm Sundt Bøe (30 September 1915 – 19 October 1980) was a Norwegian organizational leader. He was born in Bergen. He was a co-founder of the Bergen chapter of the Red Cross, and later had leading positions in the Red Cross in Bergen, Oslo and in the Norwegian Red Cross. After World War II he was engaged in international humanitarian work. He was decorated Knight, First Order of the Order of St. Olav in 1976.

References

1915 births
1980 deaths
People from Bergen in health professions
Norwegian humanists
Grini concentration camp survivors
Recipients of the King's Medal of Merit in gold
Recipients of the Red Cross Badge of Honour